Gushikawa Castle may refer to:

 Gushikawa Castle (Kume)
 Gushikawa Castle (Itoman)